Newburg is the name of two places  in the U.S. state of Michigan:

 Newburg, Lenawee County, Michigan:
 Newburg, Shiawassee County, Michigan